Kyyvesi (transl. Viper Water) is a rather large lake in the Southern Savonia region of Finland. Despite its size (129,95 km²) it is very shallow and extremely rocky. Motorboating on Kyyvesi is recommended only for very experienced boaters as many of the rocks have not been mapped. Also, the limited amount of landing sites is a hindrance in moving swiftly through the lake. A general bathymetric chart was completed in 2006. Canoes, kayaks and rowing boats are recommended for visitors. There is a two-lake canoeing route Kyyvesi–Puula with nice little harbours. The water is dark for the catchment area is mostly swampy terrain. Locals claim that two sorts of zander fishes are living in the lake.

See also
List of lakes in Finland

References

External links

Lakes of Kangasniemi
Lakes of Mikkeli